Troy Beetles, (born June 8, 1988) better known by his stage name Datsik, is a former Canadian DJ and music producer. His first release was in the spring of 2009. He has since played at venues all over the world, including festivals such as Coachella, Ultra Music Festival, EDC Las Vegas, Stereosonic, Boonstock, Shambhala Music Festival, and Electric Zoo.

In March 2015, Datsik partnered with Electronic Music lifestyle brand Electric Family to produce a bracelet for which 100% of the proceeds are donated to Lupus Foundation of America, which works to cure and improve the lives of all that are affected by Lupus.

In March 2018, Beetles was accused of sexual assault spanning multiple years, resulting in public backlash and cancellation of all Datsik appearances at upcoming shows and festivals. He officially stepped down from his label Firepower Records. On March 15, 2018, he was dropped by Deckstar and Circle Talent Agency following the accusations.

In October 2018, fan screenshots of text message conversations with Datsik began surfacing online, hinting that Datsik has gotten sober, is working on new music, and plans to return to the electronic music scene. 

In November 2019, Datsik broke his 18 month hiatus with a video uploaded to his facebook page. In the video he discussed plans to return to the music industry. He also mentioned having been staying in a live-in therapy facility. He claimed he had gotten sober, and apologized for the ways of this old lifestyle and stated that "It is a lifestyle that I am no longer practicing... and one that I have worked hard to overcome." Public response to the video was mixed, as the artist failed to make any mention of or address the numerous and serious sexual assault accusations against him. Comments on the video ranged from celebration to outrage.

In August 2020, amidst the coronavirus pandemic, Datsik marked his return to music by posting 4 songs from his new album "Afterlife" on SoundCloud and YouTube.

Biography
Beetles was born on June 8, 1988, in Kelowna, British Columbia, Canada. His stage name derives from his old Xbox Live gamertag. He began producing dubstep after seeing Excision perform at Shambhala electronic music festival in 2008. Soon afterward, the two began collaborating and released several tracks together in 2009 and 2010 on Excision's Rottun Recordings. 

In 2009, Datsik had several number one releases on Beatport. He had remixed and collaborated with artists including The Crystal Method, Noisia, Wu-Tang Clan, and Diplo, and has performed with Steve Aoki, Rusko, Bassnectar, Skream, DJ Craze, Benny Benassi and Nero, among others.

Beetles cited a wide range of musical inspirations, including Wu-Tang Clan members RZA and Method Man. He has described his sound as "dark and robotic", while trying to remain "funky and gangster" and "dirty".

He released his debut album Vitamin D through Dim Mak Records and Last Gang Records on April 10, 2012. The album features 12 songs as well as appearances from Downlink, Z-Trip, Infected Mushroom, Jonathan Davis, Messinian and Snak the Ripper.

Firepower Records

In January 2012, Datsik founded his own record label, Firepower Records. It is named for his 2011 record of the same. He has already signed a wide variety of dubstep producers and bass musicians. Datsik released the Cold Blooded EP and his Let It Burn LP through this label.

In March 2018, Datsik cancelled his remaining tour performances and stepped down from Firepower Records amid numerous allegations.

Discography 

Studio albums
 Vitamin D (2012)
 Let It Burn LP (2013)
 Afterlife LP (2020)

References

Living people
1988 births
Canadian DJs
Canadian electronic musicians
Dubstep musicians
Moombahcore musicians
Musicians from Kelowna
Remixers
Electronic dance music DJs